is a city located in Yamaguchi Prefecture, Japan. With a population of 265,684, it is the largest city in Yamaguchi Prefecture and the fifth-largest city in the Chūgoku region. It is located at the southwestern tip of Honshu facing the Tsushima Strait at the entrance to the Kanmon Straits (also known as the Straits of Shimonoseki) across from the city of Kitakyushu and the island of Kyushu. It is nicknamed the "Fugu Capital" for the locally caught pufferfish, and is the largest harvester of the pufferfish in Japan.

History
The geographical position of Shimonoseki has given it historical importance. The Heike and Genji fought at Dan-no-ura near the present Kanmon Bridge. In February 1691, German explorer Engelbert Kaempfer visited the town as part of his two-year stay in Japan, and described it as having around 400 to 500 houses, and as a major port in the region for supplying ship provisions. The Bombardment of Shimonoseki occurred in 1864, and the Treaty of Shimonoseki was signed there in 1895, seeing a defeated China hand over Taiwan, Penghu, and Port Arthur to the victorious Japanese.

An Imperial decree in July 1899 established Shimonoseki as an open port for trading with the United States and the United Kingdom.

On February 13, 2005, Shimonoseki absorbed the towns of Hōhoku, Kikugawa, Toyota and Toyoura (all from Toyoura District) to create the new and expanded city of Shimonseki. Since October 1, 2005, the city has been designated as a core city by the Japanese Government.

Climate
Shimonoseki has a humid subtropical climate (Köppen climate classification Cfa) with hot summers and cool winters. Precipitation is significant throughout the year, but is heavier in summer.

Demographics
Per Japanese census data, the population of Shimonoseki in 2020 is 255,051 people. Shimonoseki has been conducting censuses since 1920.

Transportation

Ferries from Shimonoseki Port International Terminal
The Kanpu ferry to Busan, South Korea regularly.
The Gwangyang Beech to Gwangyang, South Korea regularly.
The Orient ferry to Shanghai, China regularly.
The Orient ferry to Qingdao, China was suspended in November 2015.

Trains

The main Shinkansen station
Sanyō Shinkansen
Shin-Shimonoseki Station
The main JR West stations
San'yō Main Line
Shimonoseki Station
Hatabu Station - Hatabu Station is a railway station on the San'yō Main Line and the San'in Main Line.
Shin-Shimonoseki Station - Shin-Shimonoseki Station is a railway station on the Sanyō Shinkansen Line and the San'yō Main Line.
Chōfu Station
Ozuki Station
San'in Main Line
Hatabu Station
Ayaragi Station
Kajikuri-Gōdaichi Station
Yasuoka Station
Fukue Station
Yoshimi Station
Umegatō Station
Kuroimura Station
Kawatana-Onsen Station
Kogushi Station
Yutama Station
Ukahongō Station
Nagato-Futami Station
Takibe Station
Kottoi Station
Agawa Station
Nagato-Awano Station

Buses
Regular bus services are provided by Sanden Kohtsu, as well as by group companies of Sanden Kohtsu.
Bus companies (A loop-line bus in the city.)
 Sanden Kohtsu Co., Ltd.
 Blue Line Kohtsu Co., Ltd.
Intercity bus services (arrival and departure in Shimonoseki city) go to the following destinations: Tokyo, Osaka, Kobe, Hiroshima, Fukuoka, Fukuoka Airport, etc.

Roads

Expressway
Chūgoku Expressway
Shimonoseki interchange
Ozuki interchange

Bypasses
 Ozuki Bypass
 Shimonoseki-Kita Bypass

National Highways
 National Route 2
 National Route 9
 National Route 191
 National Route 435
 National Route 491

Airports
Shimonoseki is served by four airports outside the city.
Kitakyūshū Airport
Saga Airport
Yamaguchi Ube Airport (only for domestic flights)
Fukuoka Airport

Education

Universities and colleges

  (Yoshimi)
 Shimonoseki City University (Daigaku-cho)
 University of East Asia (Shin-Shimonoseki Station)
 Baiko Gakuin University (Higashieki)
 Baiko Gakuin University Women's Junior College (Shimonoseki)
 Shimonoseki Junior College (Sakurayama-cho)

Primary and secondary schools

The city has a North Korean school, .

As a city of a quarter million people, it has some public schools too.

Culture

Festivals
Shimonoseki is home to many festivals that are held throughout the year. Of these, the most famous are the Shimonoseki Kaikyo Festival and Shimonoseki Bakan Festival.
Shimonoseki Fugu (Blowfish) Festival (February) : Haedomari Market
Kawatana Onsen(hot spring) Festival (April)
Shimonoseki Kaikyo Festival (May) : Karato, Ganryujima Island
Suhouteisai Festival (August) : Castle town Chofu
Kanmon Kaikyo Fireworks Festival (August) : Karato(Aruka Port area)
Shimonoseki Bakan Festival (August) : Along the street from Karato-cho to Shimonoseki Station
TOUR de Shimonoseki (October/November)
Shimonoseki Kaikyo Marathon (November)
Shimonoseki Fish Festival (November) : Shimonoseki Fishing Port
Little Busan Fest (November) : Green Mall

Architecture 
Kōzan-ji - The butsuden completed in 1320 is a National Treasure of Japan.
Akama Shrine
Kaikyō Yume Tower

Museums
Shimonoseki City Art Museum
Shimonoseki City Museum of History
Shimonoseki City Archaeological Museum
Shimonoseki Marine Science Museum (Shimonoseki City Aquarium) (Kaikyo Kan)
Doigahama Site Anthropological Museum
The Firefly Museum of Toyota Town
The  of the Yamaguchi Bank

Parks and monuments
The  in Shimonoseki commemorates the final stage of the Genpei war between the feudal Taira clan and Minamoto clan (1180–1185). There is a historical monument with cannons.

Sports

Professional Teams
FC Baleine Shimonoseki (Football)

Sporting venues
Shimonoseki Baseball Stadium
Shimonoseki Boat Race Stadium (Shimonoseki Kyōtei)
Shimonoseki City Gymnasium
Shimonoseki Track and field stadium
Shimonoseki city swimming pool
Nogihama General Park (Football stadium)

Crime and safety
The Goda-ikka yakuza syndicate is headquartered in Shimonoseki. A designated yakuza group, the Goda-ikka is the largest yakuza syndicate in Yamaguchi Prefecture.

Twin towns – sister cities

Shimonoseki is twinned with:

 Santos, Brazil (1971)
 Istanbul, Turkey (1972)
 Busan, South Korea (1976)
 Qingdao, China (1979)
 Pittsburg (California), United States (1998)

Notable people

 Kinuyo Tanaka
 Yūsaku Matsuda
 Atsushi Tamura (Comedian, actor and singer)

References

External links

Shimonoseki City official website 
 Shimonoseki City official website in other languages
 
 
 
 City Tourism Promotion Film Shimonoseki City Official Channel

 
Cities in Yamaguchi Prefecture
Port settlements in Japan
Populated coastal places in Japan